Tristan Maea Teuhema (born October 17, 1996) is an American football guard for the San Antonio Brahmas of the XFL. He played college football for Southeastern Louisiana after being suspended from LSU in 2017. He had stints with the San Antonio Commanders of the Alliance of American Football (AAF), Dallas Renegades, Orlando Guardians, and Arlington Renegades of the XFL, and the Michigan Panthers of the United States Football League (USFL).

High school career 
A native of Keller, Texas, Teuhema attended Keller High School, where he was an All-American offensive lineman. His older brother, Sione Teuhema, was a defensive lineman for Keller. Regarded as a four-star recruit by ESPN, Maea Teuhema was ranked as the No. 2 offensive guard prospect in the class of 2015. Both Sione and Maea Teuhema verbally committed to Texas in May 2013, but decommitted after head coach Mack Brown resigned. In February 2014, both Teuhema brothers committed to Louisiana State.

College career 
As a true freshman, Teuhema played in all 12 games and started the last 11 at left guard, as part of an offensive line that helped Leonard Fournette rush for an LSU single-season rushing record of 1,953 yards. As a sophomore, Teuhema split time between both guard spots early in his sophomore campaign before settling in as the starting right tackle for the final six games of the season.

In August 2017, LSU suspended Teuhema for academic reasons, causing him to transfer to Southeastern Louisiana.

Professional career 
After going undrafted in the 2018 NFL Draft, Teuhama participated in the New Orleans Saints rookie minicamp.

San Antonio Commanders 
On October 26, 2018, Teuhama signed with the San Antonio Commanders of the Alliance of American Football (AAF). After being on the injured reserve list to start the 2019 season, he was promoted to the active roster on March 4. The league ceased operations in April 2019.

Dallas Renegades 
In 2019, Teuhama was drafted in the open phase of the 2020 XFL Draft by the Dallas Renegades. He was waived by the Renegades and claimed off waivers by the New York Guardians on January 7, 2020. He was waived during final roster cuts on January 22, 2020. He signed with the Team 9 practice squad during the regular season. He was re-signed by the Guardians on March 9, 2020. He had his contract terminated when the league suspended operations on April 10, 2020.

Michigan Panthers
On March 10, 2022, Teuhema was drafted by the Michigan Panthers of the United States Football League.

Arlington Renegades
The Arlington Renegades selected Teuhema in the seventh round of the 2023 XFL Supplemental Draft on January 1, 2023. He was released on February 15, 2023.

San Antonio Brahmas 
Teuhama signed with the San Antonio Brahmas of the XFL on February 21, 2023.

References

External links 
 
 Southeastern Louisiana Lions bio
 LSU Tigers bio

1996 births
Living people
American football offensive linemen
LSU Tigers football players
Southeastern Louisiana Lions football players
People from Keller, Texas
Dallas Renegades players
New York Guardians players
San Antonio Commanders players
Team 9 players
Michigan Panthers (2022) players
Arlington Renegades players
San Antonio Brahmas players